Poska and Poška are Baltic surnames and may refer to:

Antanas Poška (1903-1992), Lithuanian traveler and anthropologist
Jaan Poska (1866–1920), Estonian lawyer, diplomat and politician
Kristiina Poska (born 1978), Estonian conductor
Vera Poska-Grünthal (1898–1986), Estonian lawyer and feminist

Estonian-language surnames
Lithuanian-language surnames